Divorce is an upcoming Malayalam movie written and directed by Mini IG which depicts the life of 6 divorced women starring Chandhunadh, Santhosh Keezhattoor, P. Sreekumar, Shibla Fara etc. It is one of the first Malayalam movie selected by Govt of Kerala for funding through Kerala State Film Development Corporation for uplifting works of women directors. It is also one among the first Malayalam movie to be tax free in Kerala. The movie got censor certificate in 2020 and was previewed in Kalabhavan theatre and will be released in theatre on 24 February 2023.

Plot
The film portrays six women  and their near ones from different socio- economic backgrounds undergoing the turmoil due to the disintegration in the family. When they approach the judicial system for justice, it has certain conventional measures to reach legal conclusions and their lives gets a complete overhaul.

Cast
 Chandhunadh
 Santhosh Keezhattoor
 P. Sreekumar
 Shibla Fara
 Priyamvada Krishnan
 KPAC Leela
 Aswathi Kishore
 Amalendhu
 Suresh Kumar
 Manikuttan
 Jolly Chirayath
 Ishitha
 Arunamshu

References

2020s Malayalam-language films
Films about women in India